Denny Hollow is a valley in Oregon County in the U.S. state of Missouri.

Denny Hollow has the name of John Denney, a pioneer citizen.

References

Valleys of Oregon County, Missouri
Valleys of Missouri